Mashin (also Romanized as Māshīn; also known as Deh-e Māshīn and Marshīn) is a village in Taftan-e Jonubi Rural District, Nukabad District, Khash County, Sistan and Baluchestan Province, Iran. At the 2006 census, its population was 23, in 5 families.

References 

Populated places in Khash County